This Is Not the End is the fourth studio album by Australian band Baby Animals, released in May 2013. The album comes two decades since their last full-length studio album.  The album debuted and peaked at number 19, becoming the band's third top 20 album. The album debuted at number 3 on the Australian indie chart.

The band promoted the album with the "Feed the Birds" tour throughout Australia in 2013.

Commercial performance 
This Is Not the End debuted at number 19 in Australia. Lead singer Suze Demarchi said: "Somehow cracking the top twenty this time around feels better than hitting number one all those years ago. When people tell you it can't be done, it can, and you can do it your way. You can't do it alone but you don't have to compromise".

Track listing 
 "Email" (Dave Leslie, Suze DeMarchi) – 3:42
 "Bonfires" (Dave Leslie, Suze DeMarchi) – 4:40
 "Under Your Skin" (Dave Leslie, Suze DeMarchi) – 3:49
 "Stitch" (Suze DeMarchi) – 3:43
 "Invisible Dreamer" (Dave Leslie, Suze DeMarchi) – 3:46
 "Warm Bodies" (Dave Leslie, Suze DeMarchi) – 4:13
 "Things That Make You Stay" (Dave Leslie, Suze DeMarchi) – 3:46
 "Priceless" (Dave Leslie, Suze DeMarchi) – 3:15
 "Hot Air Balloon" (Justin Stanley, Suze DeMarchi) – 4:27
 "Got It Bad" (Dave Leslie, Suze DeMarchi) – 3:39
 "Winters Day" (Dave Leslie, Suze DeMarchi) – 4:04

Personnel
Dave Leslie – guitar, backing vocals
Dario Bortolin – bass
Mick Skelton – drums, percussion
David Nicholas – engineer, producer, mixer
Stu Hunter – keyboards
Suze DeMarchi – lead vocals, guitar
Don Bartley – mastering
Jez Smith – photography

Charts

Release history

References

External links 
 https://www.discogs.com/Baby-Animals-This-Is-Not-The-End/release/4610987

2013 albums
Baby Animals albums
Social Family Records albums